The Hsanda Gol Formation is a geological formation located in the Tsagan Nor Basin of central Mongolia that dates to the Rupelian age of the Oligocene epoch. It formed in continental desert-like conditions and is notable for its fossil mammals, first excavated by Roy Chapman Andrews and the American Museum of Natural History in the 1920s. Hsanda Gol is included in the Hsandagolian Asian Land Mammal Age, to which it gives its name.

Geology
The 2600 feet thick Hsanda Gol formation is covered in various places by Miocene-age variegated clays, sands, and gravels. It rests on top of the Early Cretaceous Hühteeg Svita formation. The lower portions of the formation are composed of yellow conglomerate, with the higher areas being dominated by red clays, silts and sands, as well as lava and basalt flows.

Hsanda Gol was traditionally assigned to the Middle Oligocene, but after the reassignation of the preceding Ergilian age to the Late Eocene it has now been rendered early Oligocene. It is followed after a faunal hiatus by the overlaying Loh Formation which extends from the Late Oligocene into the Miocene and also contains fossil mammals. Paleomagnetism in underlying and overlaying lava flows establish the beginning of the formation at the end of the magnetic Chron C13n 33.4 million years ago, and its end at the Chron C12n, 31 million years ago.

The Hsanda Gol levels rest directly over, and are continuous with the earlier Houldjin Gravels which are sometimes counted as part of the formation, but were rather deposited during the latest Eocene under wetter and more energetic conditions. In general, the Houldjin Gravels and the Hsanda Gol formation show a transition from more humid, forested conditions to an arid climate with presence of dunes and ephemeral rivers. Some taxa lived through this change including hyaenodonts and indricotheres, but others, such as brontotheres, amynodonts, rhinocerotids and entelodonts went extinct and are as a result absent from Hsanda Gol proper. The following Loh Formation, on the other hand, represents a return to more benign conditions as indicated by the reappearance of rhinocerotids and the entry of the first chalicotheres.

Paleobiota
Hsanda Gol's paleobiota resembles current desert mammal faunas, including the one found in the same area today. It is composed largely of rodents and lagomorphs with high-crowned teeth adapted to chew hard vegetation; several of these species are fossorial and none arboreal, indicating that there were no areas with high tree density. The only large browsing ungulate, Paraceratherium, was probably transient and there were no medium-large herbivores. Predators were diverse but generally small, with the largest (Hyaenodon) being wolf-sized, and were adapted to hunt by ambush. Landscape would appear as a sparse plain with few tall trees near rivers or where groundwater could be found otherwise. Pallinology studies in contemporary sites of China and Mongolia are consistent with an arid-adapted woody scrubland dominated by Mormon tea and salt-tolerant nitre bush. The few trees were broad-leaved and deciduous, related to modern elm, birch, and oak.

Amphibians

Reptiles

Mammals

Leptictids

Erinaceids

Rodents

Lagomorphs

Carnivorans

Perissodactyls

Artiodactyls

Creodonts

References 

[9] ^ http://www.fossilworks.org/cgi-bin/bridge.pl?a=collectionSearch&taxon_no=336714&max_interval=Oligocene&country=Mongolia&is_real_user=1&basic=yes&type=view&match_subgenera=1

Geologic formations of Mongolia
Paleogene System of Asia
Oligocene Asia
Rupelian Stage
Paleontology in Mongolia